Rafael L. Espinal Jr. (born June 30, 1984) is an American politician and non-profit executive. A Democrat, he represented the 37th district of the New York City Council, which includes portions of Bedford-Stuyvesant, Brownsville, Bushwick, Crown Heights, Cypress Hills, and East New York in Brooklyn.

On January 26, 2020, he resigned from the City Council in favor of a job with the Freelancers Union.

Early life and education
Espinal has lived in Brooklyn all his life, while his parents are from the Dominican Republic. He was born in 1984, and is the third of six children. He was raised in Cypress Hills, attending and graduating from New York City public schools, P.S. 108, I.S. 302, and Franklin K. Lane High School. Espinal attended Queens College and graduated with a bachelor's degree in English.

Career
Espinal first worked as an adult literacy teacher.
Espinal entered public service as an aide to City Councilmember Erik Martin Dilan, ultimately serving as his chief of staff.

In the 2016 Democratic Party presidential primaries, he was the only New York City Councilmember to endorse Bernie Sanders. He endorsed him again for the 2020 primaries, the first City Councilmember to do so.

In 2017, Espinal was named one of Time Out New York's "New Yorkers of the Year", largely in recognition of his advocacy in repealing the New York City Cabaret Law, enforcement of which disproportionately targeted LGBTQ and ethnic minority venues and creating the city's Office of Nightlife, dedicated to supporting DIY art spaces, music venues, bars and restaurants.

In 2019, Espinal ran in the special election for New York City Public Advocate, following Letitia James's victory in her race for New York State Attorney General. He came in 7th place in a crowded field of 17 candidates, won by fellow Brooklyn City Councilmember Jumaane Williams.

Espinal, facing term limits to another term in the City Council, announced plans to run for Brooklyn Borough President in the 2021 election. The seat will be vacant as current Borough President, Eric Adams, faces term limits himself. He dropped out of the race in January 2020, and subsequently resigned from the Council entirely.

New York State Assembly
In his first campaign, Espinal won the open 54th district seat in the New York State Assembly in a special election held on September 13, 2011. The seat was left vacant after Darryl Towns resigned from the post in order to take a position with Governor Andrew Cuomo's administration. The assembly district represents parts of Bushwick, East New York, Bedford-Stuyvesant, Cypress Hills, and Cityline in Brooklyn.

Espinal had endorsements from the Brooklyn Democratic Party, the Republican Party and the Conservative Party of New York State. In a tight race, Espinal (46%) defeated Jesus Gonzalez (35%) running on the Working Families Party line and Deidra Towns (19%) running on her party platform, "Community First".

In 2012, Espinal was named one of City & State's "New York City Rising Stars: 40 Under 40" for his work as New York State Assemblyman.

New York City Council
In 2013, Espinal opted to leave the state Assembly to run for the New York City Council to succeed Erik Martin Dilan, and won the primary and general to take the seat in 2014.

In 2014 Mayor Bill de Blasio announced an affordable housing plan that would create over 3,000 units of affordable housing in the Cypress Hills, East New York, and Ocean Hill portions of his district. Espinal used the opportunity to advocate for funding to address all of the social and infrastructure issues his community had experienced for decades. While facing opposition from a citywide advocacy group, Espinal was able to secure what some have called the most comprehensive rezoning plan in the City of New York, over a quarter of a billion dollars to address unemployment, crumbling infrastructure, and affordable housing issues. The New York Times endorsed Espinal's move and stated that "Espinal did right by his constituents."

In 2017 Espinal introduced and passed a bill calling for the full repeal of the New York City Cabaret Law, a regulation introduced in 1926 and often called racist, homophobic and authoritarian by its opponents.

In 2019 Espinal passed legislation requiring all New York City buildings to install solar panels or green roofs as part of New York City's "Green New Deal" to decrease carbon emissions and build green infrastructure.

On January 26, 2020, he officially resigned from the City Council to take on a job with the Freelancers Union.

Election history

References

External links
Espinal - New York City Council (official site)
Espinal for Brooklyn (campaign website)
@RLEspinal (official twitter)

Living people
American politicians of Dominican Republic descent
Democratic Party members of the New York State Assembly
New York City Council members
Hispanic and Latino American New York City Council members
Hispanic and Latino American state legislators in New York (state)
21st-century American politicians
Politicians from Brooklyn
People from East New York, Brooklyn
1984 births